Mighty Mouse: The New Adventures is an American animated television series. It is a revival of the Mighty Mouse cartoon character. Produced by Bakshi-Hyde Ventures (a joint venture of animator Ralph Bakshi and producer John W. Hyde) and Terrytoons, it aired on CBS on Saturday mornings from fall 1987 through the 1988–89 season. It was briefly rerun on Saturday mornings on Fox Kids in November 1992.

The quality of Mighty Mouse as compared with other 1980s animated television series is considered by animation historian Jerry Beck to "foreshadow the higher quality [animation] boom coming in the next decade." It was one of the first Saturday morning cartoons on CBS to be broadcast in stereo.

Format
The series was a commercial half-hour format (22 minutes plus commercials), and each episode consisted of two self-contained 11-minute cartoon segments. It differed from the earlier incarnations of Mighty Mouse in many ways. It gave Mighty Mouse the secret identity of Mike Mouse, a sidekick in the form of the orphan Scrappy Mouse (who knows the hero's secret identity), heroic colleagues such as Bat-Bat and his sidekick Tick the Bug Wonder and the League of Super-Rodents, as well as introduced antagonists like Petey Pate, Big Murray, Madame Marsupial and the Cow (actually a bull, because he is Madame Marsupial's boyfriend and he possesses male traits). The original Mighty Mouse villain Oil Can Harry made a couple of appearances. Pearl Pureheart was not always the damsel in distress and many episodes did not feature her at all. Mighty Mouse's light-operatic singing was eliminated except for his trademark, "Here I come to save the day!", which was sometimes interrupted.

Unlike other American animated TV shows of the time (and even Mighty Mouse's past theatrical shorts) the show's format was loose and episodes did not follow a particular formula. Episodes varied from superhero-type stories to parodies of shows like The Honeymooners ("Mighty's Wedlock Whimsy") and the 1960s Batman series ("Night of the Bat-Bat" and "Bat with a Golden Tongue"), movies like Fantastic Voyage ("Mundane Voyage") and Japanese monster films (the opening of "Mighty's Wedlock Whimsy"), comic books ("See You in the Funny Papers"), and even lampooned other cartoons ("Don't Touch That Dial!") and specifically Alvin and the Chipmunks ("Mighty's Benefit Plan").

The series resurrected other Terrytoons characters, but acknowledged the passage of time: perennial menace Oil Can Harry returns to chase Pearl Pureheart once more ("Still Oily After All These Years"), 1940s characters Gandy Goose and Sourpuss and 1960s character Deputy Dawg are revived (Gandy and Dawg frozen in time in blocks of ice) in "The Ice Goose Cometh", "Gaston Le Crayon" has a cameo ("Still Oily After All These Years") and Bakshi's own 1960s creations the Mighty Heroes appear, aged, in the episode "Heroes and Zeroes". Fellow Terrytoons characters Heckle and Jeckle also appear in "Mighty's Wedlock Whimsy".

Cast
Patrick Pinney as  Mighty Mouse (Mike Mouse) / Gandy Goose / Petey Pate
Maggie Roswell as Pearl Pureheart / Additional Voices
Dana Hill as Scrappy Mouse
Charlie Adler as Bat-Bat (Bruce Vein) / Additional Voices
Joe Alaskey as Sourpuss / Additional Voices
Michael Pataki as The Cow / Additional Voices
Beau Weaver as Fractured Narrator / Additional Voices

Crew
 Producer/Supervising Director/Story Direction: Ralph Bakshi
 Executive Producer: John Hyde
 Executive in charge of production: Tom Klein
 Senior Director: John Kricfalusi (season 1), Kent Butterworth (season 2)
 Directors: John Kricfalusi, John Sparey, Bruce Woodside, Bob Jaques, Kent Butterworth
 Writers (Season 1): Tom Minton, Doug Moench, Nate Kanfer, Jim Reardon, Eddie Fitzgerald, Rich Moore, Andrew Stanton
 Writers (Season 2): Jim Reardon, Tom Minton
 Layout artists: Ken Boyer, Mike Kazaleh, Kathleen Castillo, William Recinos, Jim Gomez, Lynne Naylor, Dave Concepcion, Bruce Timm

Development

Origin and production
In April 1987, Bakshi set up a meeting with Judy Price, the head of CBS's Saturday morning block. Price rejected Bakshi's prepared pitches, including one featuring John Kricfalusi's Ren & Stimpy characters, but asked what else he had. He told her that he had the rights to Mighty Mouse and she agreed to purchase the series. However, Bakshi did not own the rights and did not know who did. While researching the rights, he learned that CBS had acquired the entire Terrytoons library in 1955 and forgotten about it. According to Bakshi, "I sold them a show they already owned, so they just gave me the rights for nothin'!"

Kricfalusi's team wrote story outlines for 13 episodes in a week and pitched them to Price. By the next week, Kricfalusi had hired animators he knew who had been working at other studios. They ended up hiring Jeff Pidgeon, Rich Moore, Carole Holiday, Andrew Stanton and Nate Kanfer. Mighty Mouse: The New Adventures went into production in the month it was greenlighted; it was scheduled to premiere on September 19, 1987. This haste required the crew to be split into four teams, led by supervising director Kricfalusi, Fitzgerald, Steve Gordon and Bruce Woodside. Each team was given a handful of episodes and operated almost entirely independently of the others. Although the scripts required approval by CBS executives, Kricfalusi insisted that the artists add visual gags as they drew.

Despite the time constraints, CBS was pleased with the way Bakshi Productions addressed the network's notes. Kricfalusi did not return for the second season and took some of the crew to work on The New Adventures of Beany and Cecil for ABC.

Production style
Kricfalusi described Mighty Mouse: The New Adventures as the origin of the "'Creator-Driven' revolution" and that he hired artists "dissatisfied with the formula cartoons they were forced to work on at other studios" and as a "witty, satirical and wildly imaginative" series and "quite a revolution when compared to the cartoons being made everywhere else."  Kricfalusi said that he supervised the development of the cartoon in all aspects except the final editing.

Kricfalusi said that he restored the "old time-director-unit system" in which three or four directors theoretically supervise all of the creative aspects of each individual cartoon. He said that two of the directors felt "kind of" reluctant to participate as they did not "really approve" of the direction. Kricfalusi intended for the cartoon to be "like a Warner Bros. cartoon", and that the show does not have his personal humor style. He described the team as "slightly cautious" in presenting ideas to CBS's executives. Artists were allowed to use their own style in the episodes that they worked on, and that one can determine which artist drew which cartoon based on the styles present. Kricfalusi described Ken Boyer's scenes as "cute and dynamic", Istvan Majoros's scenes as "extremely crazy-looking", his own scenes as "very specifically acted", Lynne's scenes as "very girly and cartoony at the same time" and Jim Smith's scenes as "manly and well composed".

While an article about the series in Amazing Heroes #129 made it appear like Bakshi was the director of the show, Kricfalusi clarified that Bakshi was the producer and that Bakshi's creative involvement was the highest during the first several weeks of the production, after which he stood out of the way and let the team go about its business.

Usage of older cartoon footage
In order to bring down the budget so that layouts could be completed in house, a step normally done overseas by cheap foreign labor, the show opted to build three entire cartoon segments from vintage Terrytoons cartoon stock footage: "Mighty's Musical Classics", "Animation Concerto" and the bulk of "Scrappy's Playhouse". A dream sequence in "The Ice Goose Cometh" also utilized Terrytoons footage.

Additionally, three segments were clip-shows that re-used animation from previous episodes: "Stress for Success", "Anatomy of a Milquetoast" and "Mighty's Tone Poem". Kricfalusi said that the process of using the older animation was not a creative process.

Episodes

Series overview

Season 1 (1987)

Season 2 (1988)

Home media
On January 5, 2010, CBS Home Entertainment (distributed by Paramount) released the complete series on three DVDs, with every installment of the Saturday morning cartoon uncut and presented in the original full screen video format. The collection includes the uncut version of "The Littlest Tramp", in which the controversial scene begins at 9:41 in the episode, but features an error in the version of "Mighty's Wedlock Whimsy" included on the set, where the penultimate live action shot of layout artist Ed Bell is substituted with an animatic version of the shot. The actual shot as aired appears in the included documentary.

Among the extras are the documentary "Breaking the Mold: The Re-Making of Mighty Mouse" and commentary tracks for several episodes. Also included are three original Terrytoons theatrical Mighty Mouse cartoon shorts, as taken from Paramount's vaults, which are the first-ever official release of Terrytoons material on DVD.

Controversy

The show's content sometimes crossed into controversial territory. In "Mighty's Wedlock Whimsy", it is hinted that peripheral male characters Gandy Goose and Sour Puss are showering together, and — in a dream sequence — that Pearl Pureheart has a lovechild with Mighty Mouse's unhinged nemesis the Cow.

During the production of the episode "The Littlest Tramp", editor Tom Klein expressed concern that a sequence showing Mighty Mouse sniffing the remains of a crushed flower resembled cocaine use. Bakshi did not initially view the footage; he believed that Klein was overreacting, but agreed to let him cut the scene. Kricfalusi expressed disbelief over the cut, insisting that the action was harmless and that the sequence should be restored. Following Kricfalusi's advice, Bakshi told Klein to restore the scene, which had been approved by network executives and the CBS Standards and Practices department. The episode aired on October 31, 1987, initially without controversy.

On June 6, 1988, Donald Wildmon, head of the American Family Association (AFA), alleged that "The Littlest Tramp" depicted cocaine use, instigating a media frenzy. Concerning Bakshi's involvement with Mighty Mouse: The New Adventures, the AFA claimed that CBS "intentionally hired a known pornographer to do a cartoon for children, and then allowed him to insert a scene in which the cartoon hero is shown sniffing cocaine." Bakshi responded, "You could pick a still out of Lady and the Tramp and get the same impression. Fritz the Cat wasn't pornography. It was social commentary. This all smacks of burning books and the Third Reich. It smacks of McCarthyism. I'm not going to get into who sniffs what. This is lunacy!"

Bakshi defended the episode, saying, "I despise drugs. I would be out of my mind to show a cartoon character snorting cocaine in a cartoon", and stating that Wildmon had interpreted the scene out of context. "Mighty Mouse was happy after smelling the flowers because it helped him remember the little girl who sold it to him fondly. But even if you're right, their accusations become part of the air we breathe. That's why I cut the scene. I can't have children wondering if Mighty Mouse is using cocaine." On CBS's order, Klein removed the sequence from the master broadcast footage.

Wildmon claimed that the edits were "a de facto admission that, indeed, Mighty Mouse was snorting cocaine". Bakshi agreed to the removal of the offending 3½ seconds from future airings of the episode because of his concern that the controversy might lead children to believe that what Wildmon was saying was true. Wildmon's group then demanded the removal of Bakshi but, on July 25, 1988, CBS released a statement in support of him.

Influence and legacy
The show was considered revolutionary at the time and, along with 1988's Who Framed Roger Rabbit, inspired a wave of animated shows that were much zanier than those that had dominated children's animation in the previous two decades. It is credited by some as the impetus for the "creator-driven" animation revolution of the 1990s.

It was a huge springboard for many cartoonists and animators who would later become famous, among them John Kricfalusi (creator of Nickelodeon's The Ren & Stimpy Show), Bruce Timm (producer of Warner Bros. Batman: The Animated Series), Jim Reardon (writer for Warner Bros. Tiny Toon Adventures and Disney/Pixar's WALL-E, and director for Fox's The Simpsons), Tom Minton (writer and producer for many Warner Bros. television cartoons, including Tiny Toons, Animaniacs, The Sylvester and Tweety Mysteries, Baby Looney Tunes and Duck Dodgers), Lynne Naylor (co-founder of Spümcø, character designer for Batman: The Animated Series and storyboard artist for Cartoon Network's The Powerpuff Girls and Cow and Chicken), Rich Moore (animation director for Fox/Comedy Central's Futurama, director for The Simpsons and director of Disney's Wreck-It Ralph, Zootopia and Ralph Breaks the Internet), and Andrew Stanton (director of Disney/Pixar's Finding Nemo, WALL-E and Finding Dory) and others. The Loud House creator Chris Savino says the show's classic cartoon style, which contrasted with the dominant style of TV animation at the time, spurred him to become an animator.

Kricfalusi supervised the production for the first season and directed eight of its 26 segments. Kent Butterworth supervised the second season, after John Kricfalusi's departure to work on the similarly short-lived 1988 animated series The New Adventures of Beany and Cecil. The show was licensed as a comic book series published by Marvel Comics in 1990 and 1991, which ran for 10 issues.

Comic book spin-off
From 1990 to 1991, a Mighty Mouse comic book series was published by Marvel Comics. It lasted for 10 issues and took place after the Bakshi television series. Shortly after the events of Mighty Mouse: The New Adventures, Scrappy abandons Mighty and Pearl to spend all his time at the Four Fingers Video Arcade. When the Four Fingers Video Arcade closes down, Scrappy vanishes.

It is revealed that Mighty Mouse's enemy, the Glove, was behind the Four Fingers Video Arcade. Mighty saves Scrappy in the end, but Scrappy is still "zapped" into playing video games. Scrappy is then sent to rehab and is back to normal a few issues later. In the 10th and final issue of the comic, Scrappy substitutes for Pearl Pureheart when she gives up her role in the comic.

See also
Looney Tunes
Modern animation in the United States
Terrytoons

References

External links

Mighty Mouse: The New Adventures Episode Guide at the Big Cartoon DataBase

1980s American animated television series
1987 American television series debuts
1988 American television series endings
American children's animated action television series
American children's animated adventure television series
American children's animated comedy television series
American children's animated superhero television series
American superhero comedy television series
CBS original programming
Fox Broadcasting Company original programming
Television shows adapted into comics
Animated television series about mice and rats
Television series by CBS Studios
Television series created by Ralph Bakshi
Television series by Terrytoons
Fox Kids
Animation controversies in television
Television controversies in the United States